Dysoxylum pachyrhache is a tree in the family Meliaceae. The specific epithet  is from the Greek meaning "thick axis", referring to the axis width of the inflorescence.

Description
The bark is chocolate-brown. The scented flowers are cream-coloured.

Distribution and habitat
Dysoxylum pachyrhache is endemic to Borneo. Its habitat is rain forest from sea-level to  elevation.

References

pachyrhache
Endemic flora of Borneo
Trees of Borneo
Plants described in 1940
Flora of the Borneo lowland rain forests